Mike Toop is a retired American football coach and former lacrosse coach. He served as the head football coach at the United States Merchant Marine Academy in King's Point, New York from 2005 until his retirement in 2021. Toop also served as the head football coach at Davidson College in Davidson, North Carolina from 2001 to 2004. Toop was also the head men's lacrosse coach at Union College in Schenectady, New York from 1985 to 1987 and Colgate University in Hamilton, New York from 1988 to 1991.

Head coaching record

Football

References

External links
 Merchant Marine profile

Year of birth missing (living people)
Living people
American football linebackers
Albany Great Danes football coaches
Colgate Raiders football coaches
Colgate Raiders men's lacrosse coaches
Davidson Wildcats football coaches
Merchant Marine Mariners football players
Penn Quakers football coaches
UConn Huskies football coaches
Union Dutchmen football coaches
Union Dutchmen men's lacrosse coaches
High school football coaches in New York (state)